The 2019 USC Trojans football team represented the University of Southern California in the 2019 NCAA Division I FBS football season. They played their home games at the Los Angeles Memorial Coliseum and competed as members of the South Division of the Pac-12 Conference. They were led by fourth-year head coach Clay Helton.

Previous season
The Trojans finished the 2018 season 5–7, 4–5 in Pac-12.

Preseason

Transfers

The Trojans lost nine players due to transfer. QB Matt Fink, WR Velus Jones Jr., and CB Greg Johnson all entered the NCAA transfer portal, but ultimately decided to return to USC. WR Keyshawn Pie Young, a redshirt junior, announced his intention to transfer on June 28, 2019, and on July 10 of the same year, freshman CB Trey Davis entered the NCAA transfer portal after just one month of enrollment. After QB Jack Sears was officially listed as the fourth-string quarterback on the depth chart, behind starter J.T. Daniels, true freshman Kedon Slovis and Fink, Sears decided to enter the transfer portal as well but counted for 2020 Transfer portal.

The Trojans added 4 players via transfer.

Returning starters

USC returns 25 starters in 2019 including 10 on offense, 12 on defense, and 3 on special teams.

Key departures include Aca'Cedric Ware (TB – 10 games), Tyler Petite (TE – 12 games), Chuma Edoga (OT – 10 games), Chris Brown (OG – 12 games), Toa Lobendahn (C – 11 games), Jordan Austin (OG – 1 game), Malik Dorton (DT – 11 games), Porter Gustin (OLB – 5 games), Cameron Smith (ILB – 9 games), Iman Marshall (CB – 12 games), Ajene Harris (CB – 12 games), Isaiah Langley (CB – 8 games), Jonathan Lockett (CB – 5 games), Marvel Tell III (S – 10 games), Reid Budrovich (P – 12 games), Wyatt Schmidt (H – 12 games).

Other departures include Jake Russell (WR), Daniel Imatorbhebhe (TE), Reuben Peters (ILB), and Jake Olson (LS).

Offense (10)

Defense (12)

Special teams (3)

Recruiting class

2019 NFL draft

NFL Combine

The official list of participants for the 2019 NFL Combine included USC football players ILB Cameron Smith, CB Iman Marshall, OLB Porter Gustin, OT Chuma Edoga & S Marvell Tell III.

Team players drafted into the NFL

Pac-12 media days

Pac-12 media polls
In the 2019 Pac-12 preseason media poll, USC was voted to finish in second place in the South Division behind Utah. The Trojans received the fourth most votes to win the Pac-12 Championship Game.

Schedule

Personnel

Coaching staff

Roster

Depth chart

 Depth Chart 2019 at W

True Freshman
Double Position : *

Scholarship distribution chart 

 /  / * Commit

– 85 scholarships permitted, 79 currently allotted to players

– 79 recruited players on scholarship (one former walk-ons)

– LB Tayler Katoa into two-year LDS mission.

Projecting Scholarship Distribution 2019

Game summaries

Fresno State

Stanford

BYU

Utah

Washington

Notre Dame

Arizona

Colorado

Oregon

Arizona State

California

UCLA

Iowa

Rankings

Statistics

Non-conference opponents

Pac-12 opponents

All Opponents

Offense

Defense

Key: POS: Position, SOLO: Solo Tackles, AST: Assisted Tackles, TOT: Total Tackles, TFL: Tackles-for-loss, SACK: Quarterback Sacks, INT: Interceptions, BU: Passes Broken Up, PD: Passes Defended, QBH: Quarterback Hits, FR: Fumbles Recovered, FF: Forced Fumbles, BLK: Kicks or Punts Blocked, SAF: Safeties, TD : Touchdown

Special teams

Players drafted into the NFL

References

USC
USC Trojans football seasons
USC Trojans football
USC Trojans football